Velika Krsna is a village situated in Mladenovac municipality in Serbia.

Notable individuals 

 Sreten Jocić, Serbian gangster

References

Populated places in Serbia
Villages in Serbia